XHCUE-FM is a community radio station on 96.5 FM in Cuerámaro, Guanajuato. The station is owned by the civil association Por Un Cuerámaro Mejor Comunicado, A.C.

History

Radio Sol was founded in 2007 as a pirate radio station broadcasting on 103.3 MHz, which was seized in 2017 with the civil association being fined. A community concession was approved for XHCUE on October 18, 2017, with the station coming to air 15 months later.

References

Radio stations in Guanajuato
Community radio stations in Mexico
Radio stations established in 2007